The following low-power television stations broadcast on digital or analog channel 19 in the United States:

 K19AA-D in Altus, Oklahoma
 K19AU-D in Omak, Okanogan, etc., Washington
 K19BK-D in Lakeview, Oregon
 K19BU-D in Pahrump, Nevada
 K19BY-D in Grangeville, etc,, Idaho
 K19CG-D in Belle Fourche, South Dakota
 K19CM-D in Farmington, New Mexico
 K19CV-D in Redwood Falls, Minnesota
 K19CX-D in Yuma, Arizona
 K19CY-D in Rockland, Idaho
 K19DI-D in Crowley Lake - Long, California
 K19DQ-D in Montpelier, Idaho
 K19DS-D in Pitkin, Colorado
 K19DU-D in Summit County, Utah
 K19DY-D in Canon City, Colorado
 K19EC-D in Mapleton, Oregon
 K19EG-D in Holyoke, Colorado
 K19EI-D in Pacific City/Cloverdale, Oregon
 K19EU-D in Winnemucca, Nevada
 K19EW-D in Preston, Idaho
 K19EY-D in Myton, Utah
 K19FD-D in Camp Verde, Arizona
 K19FF-D in Miles City, Montana
 K19FG-D in Jackson, Wyoming
 K19FH-D in Aspen, Colorado
 K19FX-D in Laramie, Wyoming
 K19FY-D in Chico, California
 K19FZ-D in Elko, Nevada
 K19GA-D in Susanville, etc., California
 K19GB-D in Dove Creek, etc., Colorado
 K19GD-D in Kalispell & Lakeside, Montana
 K19GH-D in Eugene, etc., Oregon
 K19GJ-D in Hatch, Utah
 K19GL-D in Yreka, California
 K19GM-D in Circleville, Utah
 K19GN-D in Mount Pleasant, Utah
 K19GS-D in Rural Beaver, etc., Utah
 K19GX-D in Buffalo, Wyoming
 K19HA-D in Navajo Mtn. Sch., etc., Utah
 K19HB-D in Oljeto, Utah
 K19HC-D in Hoehne, Colorado
 K19HE-D in Bluff, Utah
 K19HG-D in Redstone, Colorado
 K19HH-D in Midland, etc., Oregon
 K19HJ-D in Pinedale, etc., Wyoming
 K19HQ-D in Virgin, Utah
 K19HS-D in Grants Pass, Oregon
 K19HU-D in Montezuma Creek & Aneth, Utah
 K19HZ-D in Jackson, Minnesota
 K19IC-D in Eureka, California
 K19ID-D in Green River, Utah
 K19IG-D in Mexican Hat, etc., Utah
 K19IH-D in Willmar, Minnesota
 K19IM-D in Duckwater, Nevada
 K19IP-D in Flagstaff, Arizona
 K19IS-D in Inyokern, California
 K19IU-D in Battle Mountain, Nevada
 K19IX-D in Romeo, Colorado
 K19JA-D in Cortez, Colorado
 K19JC-D in Mazama, Washington
 K19JJ-D in Vale, Oregon
 K19JM-D in Emigrant, Montana
 K19JO-D in Harlowton, etc., Montana
 K19JQ-D in Big Sandy, Montana
 K19JR-D in Wolf Point, Montana
 K19JW-D in Mauna Loa, Hawaii
 K19JX-D in Yakima, Washington
 K19JZ-D in Carlsbad, New Mexico
 K19KE-D in Jolly, Texas
 K19KN-D in Eads, etc., Colorado
 K19KP-D in Hermiston, Oregon
 K19KT-D in Hobbs, New Mexico
 K19KU-D in Walla Walla, Washington
 K19KV-D in Prescott, Arizona
 K19KW-D in Greybull, Wyoming
 K19KX-D in Keokuk, Iowa
 K19KY-D in Pocatello, Idaho
 K19LA-D in Rocky Ford, Colorado
 K19LC-D in Pagosa Springs, Colorado
 K19LD-D in Bayfield, Colorado
 K19LF-D in Koosharem, Utah
 K19LG-D in Rural Garfield County, Utah
 K19LH-D in Teasdale, etc., Utah
 K19LI-D in St. James, Minnesota
 K19LJ-D in Frost, Minnesota
 K19LK-D in Panguitch, Utah
 K19LL-D in Henrieville, Utah
 K19LM-D in Cody/Powell, Wyoming
 K19LN-D in Mayfield, Utah
 K19LO-D in Rural Sevier County, Utah
 K19LP-D in Clovis, New Mexico
 K19LR-D in Huntsville, etc., Utah
 K19LS-D in Walker Lake, Nevada
 K19LT-D in Prineville, etc., Oregon
 K19LU-D in Cedar City, Utah
 K19LV-D in St. George, Utah
 K19LW-D in Sterling, Colorado
 K19LY-D in Scipio, Utah
 K19LZ-D in Las Cruces & Organ, New Mexico
 K19MA-D in Leamington, Utah
 K19MC-D in Bonnerdale, Arkansas
 K19MD-D in Orangeville, Utah
 K19ME-D in Overton, Nevada
 K19MF-D in East Carbon County, Utah
 K19MG-D in Rawlins, Wyoming
 K19MH-D in Fruitland, Nevada
 K19MI-D in Salem, Oregon
 K19MJ-D in Yerington, Nevada
 K19MK-D in Lake Tahoe, Nevada
 K19ML-D in Wray, Colorado
 K19MM-D in Ruth, Nevada
 K19MN-D in Lake George, Colorado
 K19MP-D in Gallup, New Mexico
 K19MS-D in Alexandra, Minnesota
 K19MZ-D in Arriba, Colorado
 K19NB-D in Gustine, California
 K19NE-D in Gateway, Colorado
 K19NF-D in Socorro, New Mexico
 K43MB-D in Orderville, Utah
 KAJN-CD in Lafayette, Louisiana
 KBBV-CD in Bakersfield, California
 KCBB-LD in Boise, Idaho
 KCKS-LD in Kansas City, Kansas
 KDOS-LD in Globe, Arizona
 KFBI-LD in Medford, Oregon
 KGBS-CD in Austin, Texas
 KGRX-LD in Gila River Indian Community, Arizona, an ATSC 3.0 station.
 KHDF-CD in Las Vegas, Nevada
 KIPB-LD in Pine Bluff, Arkansas
 KJYK-LD in Beaumont, Texas
 KKTW-LD in Minneapolis, Minnesota
 KLBB-LD in Lubbock, Texas
 KMBY-LD in Templeton, California
 KMPH-CD in Merced-Mariposa, California
 KMUM-CD in Sacramento, California
 KOBS-LD in San Antonio, Texas
 KOTV-DT in Mcalester, Oklahoma
 KPTN-LD in St. Louis, Missouri
 KRMA-TV (DRT) in Fort Collins, Colorado
 KSBS-CD in Denver, Colorado
 KTEV-LD in Texarkana, Arkansas
 KTGF-LD in Great Falls, Montana
 KUFS-LD in Fort Smith, Arkansas
 KUMN-LD in Moses Lake, etc., Washington
 KVBA-LD in Alamogordo, New Mexico
 KWWE-LD in Lake Charles, Louisiana
 W19CO-D in Pensacola, Florida
 W19DB-D in Franklin, North Carolina
 W19DN-D in Macon, Georgia
 W19DP-D in La Crosse, Wisconsin
 W19DW-D in Columbus, Georgia
 W19EE-D in Jacksonville, Illinois
 W19EF-D in Greenville, Mississippi
 W19EN-D in River Falls, Wisconsin
 W19EP-D in Culebra, Puerto Rico
 W19ET-D in Bath, New York
 W19EY-D in Toa Baja, Puerto Rico
 W19EZ-D in Houghton Lake, Michigan
 W19FA-D in Bangor, Maine
 W19FB-D in Traverse City, Michigan
 W19FD-D in Terre Haute, Indiana
 WBPI-CD in Augusta, Georgia
 WBWP-LD in West Palm Beach, Florida
 WBYD-CD in Pittsburgh, Pennsylvania
 WCLL-CD in Columbus, Ohio
 WCZU-LD in Bowling Green, Kentucky
 WECY-LD in Elmira, New York
 WEPA-LD in Erie, Pennsylvania
 WESH (DRT) in Ocala, Florida
 WEYW-LP in Key West, Florida
 WFND-LD in Findlay, Ohio
 WFTV (DRT) in Deltona, Florida
 WGSR-LD in Reidsville, North Carolina
 WKPZ-CD in Kingsport, Tennessee
 WLLC-LD in Nashville, Tennessee
 WLWK-CD in Sturgeon Bay, Wisconsin
 WMMF-LD in Vero Beach, Florida
 WODR-LD in Wausau, Wisconsin
 WOOT-LD in Chattanooga, Tennessee
 WPED-LD in Jackson, Tennessee
 WRUE-LD in Salisbury, Maryland
 WSBS-CD in Miami, Etc., Florida
 WSIO-LD in Galesburg, Illinois
 WSPZ-LD in DuBois, Pennsylvania
 WTKJ-LD in Watertown, New York
 WUNC-TV (DRT) in Raleigh, North Carolina
 WVGN-LD in Charlotte Amalie, U.S. Virgin Islands
 WZBJ-CD in Lynchburg, Virginia

The following low-power stations, which are no longer licensed, formerly broadcast on analog or digital channel 19:
 K19CE in Montrose, Colorado
 K19CL in Inyokern, California
 K19DO in Modena/Beryl, etc., Utah
 K19DV in Manila-Dutch John, Utah
 K19FV in Kula, Hawaii
 K19HV in Deming, New Mexico
 K19LX-D in Granite Falls, Minnesota
 K19MB-D in Mountain Home, Idaho
 K19NA-D in Idaho Falls, Idaho
 KDSL-CA in Ukiah, California
 KFJK-LD in Santa Fe, New Mexico
 KJII-LD in Lincoln, Nebraska
 KLPS-LP in Indio, California
 KMBA-LP in Ontario, Oregon
 KNTS-LP in Natchitoches, Louisiana
 KQRE-LP in Bend, Oregon
 W19BR in Monkton, Vermont
 W19CA in Lumberton, North Carolina
 W19CI in Berwick, Pennsylvania
 W19DD-D in Brevard, North Carolina
 W19DV-D in Luquillo, Puerto Rico
 W19EB-D in Lumberton, Mississippi
 WANX-LP in Columbus, Georgia
 WDXA-LD in Florence, South Carolina
 WEMW-CD in Greensburg, Pennsylvania
 WFKB-LD in Midland, Michigan
 WLOW-LP in Beaufort, South Carolina

References

19 low-power